Nosrat Saltaneh (10 November 1896 – 22 July 1932), also known as 'Aghaye Andaroun', was a Persian noblewoman. She was the daughter of Mir 'Ali Mardan Khan, Nuzrat ol-Molk and Princess Ashraf us-Sultana Qajar and sister of Amirteymour Kalali.

Notes

Sources
Agheli, Bagher, Teymourtash Dar Sahneye-h Siasate-h Iran ("Teimurtash in the Political Arena of Iran") (Javeed: Tehran, 1371).
Ansari, Ali, Modern Iran Since 1921: The Pahlavis and After (Longman: London, 2003) .
'Alí Rizā Awsatí (عليرضا اوسطى), Iran in the Past Three Centuries (Irān dar Se Qarn-e Goz̲ashteh - ايران در سه قرن گذشته), Volumes 1 and 
Sheikholeslami, Javad, So-oud va Sog-out-e Teymourtash ("The Rise and Fall of Teymourtash") (Tous: Tehran, 1379) .

1896 births
1932 deaths